Badminton was one of the seven events of 2011 Commonwealth Youth Games staged in the Isle of Man. There were five contests in the sport: boys' singles, boys' doubles, girls' singles, girls' doubles, and mixed doubles. Each Commonwealth Games Association could send up to two athletes (or two pairs) per event, for a maximum of four athletes per sex. The age of participating athletes was limited to the 14–18 years, so that only those born in 1993, 1994, 1995, 1996 or 1997 were eligible to take part.

Events

References

External links

C
2011 Commonwealth Youth Games events